Sebastián Hernández Mejía (born 2 October 1986) is a Colombian footballer who plays as an attacking midfielder for Once Caldas.

Career

Early career
Hernández started his professional career in 2004 for Deportes Quindío. He also played for Millonarios before joining Ecuadorian Serie A side Emelec in 2007. With Emelec Hernández played his first ever Copa Libertadores game; on 14 February 2007, he played 61 minutes of the Emelec's 1–0 defeat against CA Vélez Sársfield. He earned also 5 appearances in the tournament.

Hernández then went on to play in his country for Deportivo Cali, his first club Deportes Quindío and then Once Caldas.

Deportivo Táchira
In 2010, Hernández was signed by Venezuelan Primera División club Deportivo Táchira with whom he won the 2010 Torneo Apertura. In the first half of 2011, he played six games for Táchira in the Copa Libertadores.

Independiente Medellín
In July 2012, Hernández joined Independiente Medellín. He made his debut in a 1–0 home win over Deportivo Pasto on 29 July, playing the full 90 minutes. He play regularly in his first season, making 24 appearances, scoring 2 goals. His first goal came on 22 October, in a 2–1 away loss against Deportes Tolima.

Ludogorets Razgrad
On 18 January 2013, Hernández joined Bulgarian club Ludogorets Razgrad. He was given the number 10 jersey.

Career statistics
(Correct )

International career
He played with the Colombian U-20 national team at the 2005 South American Youth Championship, which Colombia hosted and won. He then competed at the 2005 FIFA World Youth Championship in the Netherlands, helping Colombia to the Round of 16 before losing to eventual champion Argentina. He was a member of the 2005 Colombian Sub 20 that won the Sudamericana.

Honours
Campeonato Suramericano Sub-17 Campeonato Mundial Sub-17 (4th place) Campeonato Suramericano Sub-20 (Colombia Campeón) Campeonato Mundial Sub-20 Campeón Centroamericano con la Sub-20 Torneo Esperanzas de Toulon.
Colegio San Jose De La Salle. Supcampeon Medellin 2012-II

Club 
Ludogorets
 Bulgarian A Group (3): 2012–13, 2013–14, 2014–15
 Bulgarian Cup: 2013–14
 Bulgarian Supercup: 2014

Cherno More
 Bulgarian Cup: 2014–15

References

External links
 
 

1986 births
Living people
Footballers from Medellín
Colombian footballers
Colombian expatriate footballers
Colombia under-20 international footballers
Colombia youth international footballers
Deportes Quindío footballers
Millonarios F.C. players
C.S. Emelec footballers
Deportivo Cali footballers
Once Caldas footballers
Deportivo Táchira F.C. players
Atlético Huila footballers
Independiente Medellín footballers
PFC Ludogorets Razgrad players
PFC Cherno More Varna players
Boluspor footballers
Categoría Primera A players
Venezuelan Primera División players
First Professional Football League (Bulgaria) players
TFF First League players
Colombian expatriate sportspeople in Ecuador
Colombian expatriate sportspeople in Venezuela
Colombian expatriate sportspeople in Bulgaria
Colombian expatriate sportspeople in Turkey
Expatriate footballers in Ecuador
Expatriate footballers in Venezuela
Expatriate footballers in Bulgaria
Expatriate footballers in Turkey
Association football midfielders